Soldier's Square or Square of the Unknown Soldier ( Midan al-Jundi al-Majhool) is a city square in Gaza City, State of Palestine, situated along Omar Mukhtar Street in the Rimal district. It is currently a large public garden popular with unemployed Gazans during the day and promenading families in the evenings.

History
Soldier's Square receives its name from an unknown native Palestinian Arab soldier (feda'i) who died during the 1948 Arab-Israeli War and was buried at the site. Prior to Israel's occupation of Gaza in 1967, the center of the site bore a statue pointing north to the rest of Palestine commemorating the soldier. It was pulled down by Israeli authorities and until the 1990s, Soldier's Square was a patch of sand with a white plinth (remnant of the statue) in the center. A public garden was later developed at the site with financial help from Norway, along with a coffeehouse serving visitors to the square.

References

Bibliography

Squares in Gaza City